Bănești may refer to the following places:

Romania
Bănești, Prahova, a commune in Prahova County
 Bănești, a village in Hălmagiu Commune, Arad County
 Bănești, a village in Sălcioara, Dâmbovița Commune, Dâmbovița County
 Bănești, a village in Iepurești Commune, Giurgiu County
 Bănești, a village in Fântânele, Suceava Commune, Suceava County
 Bănești, a village in Nicolae Bălcescu, Vâlcea Commune, Vâlcea County
 Bănești (Argeș), a river in Argeș County
 Bănești (Crișul Alb), a river in Arad County

Moldova
Bănești, Telenești, a commune in Telenești district, and its village of Băneștii Noi